John Timothy "Jay" Johnston (born February 28, 1958) is a Canadian retired ice hockey defenceman.

Johnston was born in Hamilton, Ontario. Johnston was selected by the Washington Capitals in the 1978 NHL Entry Draft, Johnston played eight games for the Capitals during the 1980-81 and 1981-82 seasons.

External links
Profile at hockeydraftcentral.com

1958 births
Canadian ice hockey defencemen
Hershey Bears players
Ice hockey people from Ontario
Sportspeople from Hamilton, Ontario
Living people
Washington Capitals draft picks
Washington Capitals players